Lithuania does not recognise same-sex marriages or civil unions. A bill to grant same-sex couples some limited legal rights and benefits is pending in the Seimas.

Civil partnerships

Background
In 2011, the Constitutional Court of Lithuania ruled that the family does not derive exclusively from marriage, opening the possibility for partnerships or other forms of legal recognition to be introduced to same-sex couples. On 25 March 2015, nine MPs from the Social Democratic Party and the Liberal Movement introduced a civil partnership bill to the Seimas. Prime Minister Algirdas Butkevičius expressed his opposition to the bill. On 6 May 2015, the Committee on Legal Affairs announced that they could find no constitutional barriers to same-sex civil partnerships. The bill was not voted on and died at the end of the legislative session in November 2016. A similar bill was introduced by deputies from the Liberal Movement on 30 May 2017. The bill was rejected at first reading in a 29–59 vote with 20 abstentions on 15 June 2017.

In 2017, the Lithuanian Farmers and Greens Union and the Homeland Union proposed a bill to establish "cohabitation agreements" as an alternative to civil partnerships. The proposed legislation would guarantee cohabitants hospital visitation rights and the right to inherit a late partner's property. Povilas Urbšys, one of the authors of the proposal, said: "Our registered project will effectively contribute to legal clarity, regulate property rights and some property unrelated relations between people living together and will also help to avoid negative consequences when the cohabitation is dissolved." The proposal, which was criticised by LGBT groups, explicitly stipulated that the cohabitants entering the agreement did not intend to create family relations. The proposal was preliminarily approved by the Seimas with 46 votes for, 17 votes against and 6 abstentions on 31 May 2017 and sent to further consideration. On 25 October 2017, the Lithuanian Government announced its support for the bill, but it stalled and was not voted on before the end of the legislative session.

On 14 February 2018, appearing at an LGBT rally in Vilnius, Prime Minister Saulius Skvernelis called on the Seimas to recognise same-sex partnerships. Of the eight candidates running in the 2019 presidential election, five expressed support for registered partnerships, namely Vytenis Andriukaitis, Arvydas Juozaitis, Valentinas Mazuronis, Ingrida Šimonytė and winner Gitanas Nausėda. The other three, Mindaugas Puidokas, Saulius Skvernelis and Naglis Puteikis, expressed support for limited legal rights such as inheritance, property rights, etc., while stating their opposition to same-sex marriage.

Legislative attempts (2021–present)

In December 2020, MP Tomas Raskevicius of the Freedom Party said that the government would submit a civil partnership bill in March 2021. The bill's introduction was a condition for creating the ruling coalition. In May 2021, more than 10,000 people took to the streets in Vilnius to protest the partnership legislation. On 25 May 2021, the civil partnership bill was defeated at first reading, receiving only 63 votes in favour of the 65 required. Raskevicius said the bill would be brought back to Parliament in an amended form during the autumn session.

A group of MPs drafted a civil union bill which would provide limited legal benefits to registered same-sex couples, and introduced it to Parliament in May 2022. The proposal is a compromise after the more expansive civil partnership bill was defeated in 2021. On 26 May 2022, the draft bill on civil unions passed its first reading in the Seimas by 70 votes in favour, 49 votes against and 6 abstentions.  On the same day, an alternative draft amendment to the Civil Code aiming to "regulate the recognition of a person's right to close relations" was also passed at its first reading with 70 votes in favour, 23 votes against, and 30 abstentions. Actress Elzbieta Latanaite said in response, "My feelings are mixed after the vote. On the one hand, the parliament took a step towards Europe, towards Western values. But on the other hand, there's nothing joyous that even such a restrained bill cannot pass without a big fight, with powerful homophobes hurling insults at citizens who want equal rights". 

a. There were a number of inconsistencies in the link regarding the vote count ("Frakcijų balsavimo rezultatai lentelėje"): (1) The numbers listed in the site show DP at only 9 MPs instead of 10 and the Regions political group at 9 instead of 8, (2) The name of current MP Ewelina Dobrowolska of LP was missing entirely from all of the vote counts, & (3) Although the MP serving as the current Speaker of the Seimas (i.e. Viktorija Čmilytė-Nielsen) was not included in the vote count of her respective political party, her name was nevertheless listed in the second column ("Asmeniniai balsavimo rezultatai lentelėje").

The Committee on Legal Affairs approved the civil union bill 6–1 in September 2022 and recommended the Seimas to pass it, while simultaneously rejecting the alternative "close connection agreement" bill. The bill now awaits a final vote in the Seimas. If passed, the legislation would establish civil unions offering some of the rights and benefits of marriage.

Same-sex marriage
Same-sex marriage is not legal in Lithuania, as the Civil Code defines marriage as a "voluntary agreement between a man and a woman". Moreover, there is an additional article in the Civil Code that explicitly bans same-sex marriages. Nevertheless, a drive to amend the Constitution of Lithuania to ban same-sex marriages was reportedly under way in December 2005 by a social conservative member of the Seimas who had started collecting signatures. Julius Sabatauskas, the chairman of the Parliament's Committee on Legal Affairs, however, denounced the plan and said it was unnecessary. Some MPs say the Constitution already bans same-sex marriage. Article 38 of the Constitution states: "Marriage shall be concluded upon the free mutual consent of man and woman." The actual effect of this statement is unknown and it has yet to be challenged in court.

2018 European Court of Justice ruling	

On 5 June 2018, the European Court of Justice (ECJ) ruled that European Union member states must recognise the freedom of movement and residency rights of same-sex spouses, provided one partner is an EU citizen. The court ruled that EU member states may choose whether or not to allow same-sex marriage, but they cannot obstruct the freedom of residence of an EU citizen and their spouse. In addition, the court ruled that the term "spouse" is gender-neutral, and that it does not necessarily imply a person of the opposite sex. On 11 January 2019, the Lithuanian Supreme Court, in compliance with the ECJ ruling, ruled that the government must grant residency permits to the same-sex spouses of EU citizens.

Public opinion
According to the 2015 Eurobarometer, 24% of Lithuanians supported same-sex marriage, the fourth lowest among EU member states alongside Slovakia. EU-wide support was 61%.

The 2019 Eurobarometer found that 30% of Lithuanians thought same-sex marriage should be allowed throughout Europe, while 63% were against.

A November 2022 opinion poll conducted by the Delfi news website showed that one in two Lithuanians supported civil unions for same-sex couples, and 70% supported civil unions for opposite-sex couples.

See also
 LGBT rights in Lithuania
 Recognition of same-sex unions in Europe

Notes

References 

LGBT rights in Lithuania
Lithuania